Charlotte McShane (born 14 August 1990 in Wick, Scotland) is a Scottish-born Australian professional triathlete and the 2013 U23 ITU World Triathlon Champion and the 2008 Xterra U20 World Champion.

McShane grew up in Helensburgh, Scotland, and moved to the Bairnsdale, Victoria area in 2005. She now lives in both Wollongong, New South Wales and Vitoria-Gasteiz, Spain. Her coach is the NSWIS head coach, Jamie Turner.

Sports career 
In 2001, McShane watched her father Frank compete at Kona and from then on she knew triathlon would be her passion. She was a student at Glasgow School of Sport, and won several Scottish national junior titles. In November 2005, her family moved to Australia and despite her young age, McShane started competing in long-distance triathlons.

In 2008, at the age of 18, McShane became the U20 Xterra World Triathlon Champion, and was 2nd Amateur Female overall (16th including pro's) (26 October 2008, Wailea Maui) and placed 4th at the  Elite Female Yeppoon 70.3 Half Ironman, 4th at the Elite Female Canberra 70.3 Half Ironman, and 6th at the Elite Female Oceania Long Distance Championships in Huskisson.

In 2009, McShane still concentrated on long-distance competitions, winning the gold medals at the Elite Female Victorian Olympic Distance Triathlon Championships, at the Elite Female Murrayman South Australian Long Distance Championships, and at the Elite Female Northern Territory Long Distance Championships. She placed 3rd at the Elite Female Shepparton 70.3 Half Ironman, and 4th at the Elite Female Canberra 70.3 Half Ironman.

In 2010, McShane returned to the Olympic Distance (Elite category) and took part in several ITU races. At Geneva, she won the European Cup silver medal and at the Grand Final of the World Championship Series in Budapest, she represented Australia in the U23 category, despite having crashed during the cycle and breaking her ribs.

In 2013, McShane finished 20th overall in the ITU World Series rankings, finishing 9th in Auckland, 10th in Yokohama, 18th in Madrid, and 13th in Stockholm. She then won the ITU U23 World Championships in London.

She competed at the 2022 Commonwealth Games where she came 11th in the women's event.

ITU competitions 

From 2006 to 2012, McShane took part in 37 ITU events and achieved 16 top ten positions. By June 2013, McShane achieved two top ten positions in the World Triathlon circuit (Yokohama, Madrid).

The following list is based upon the official ITU rankings and the ITU Athletes' Profile Page.
Unless indicated otherwise, the following events are triathlons (Olympic Distance) and refer to the Elite category.

DNF = did not finish · DNS = did not start

External links 
 Profile Page at DTR Sports Management

Notes 

Australian female triathletes
Sportspeople from Highland (council area)
Scottish emigrants to Australia
Scottish female triathletes
1990 births
Living people
Commonwealth Games competitors for Australia
Triathletes at the 2018 Commonwealth Games
Triathletes at the 2022 Commonwealth Games
People from Wick, Caithness
People from Helensburgh
Sportspeople from Argyll and Bute
People from Bairnsdale
Sportswomen from Victoria (Australia)